Just Cause is an action-adventure video game series created by Avalanche Studios. Formerly owned by Eidos Interactive and after 2009 by Square Enix Europe, it is published by Square Enix's External Studios. The series consists of Just Cause, Just Cause 2, Just Cause 3, and Just Cause 4. The games are open world and primarily take place in islands and archipelagos. Each game in the series tasks the player to overthrow the governing body of the game's setting. By June 2018, the series had shipped over 15 million copies worldwide.

The series directly draws its name from the real-life United States invasion of Panama, code-named "Operation Just Cause".

Overview
Each installment in the series takes place on a different fictional island nation, where the player plays the character Rico Rodriguez, a secret agent who originally hails from the fictional nation of Medici (featured in the third game). On foot, Rico can walk, swim, jump, and operate weapons. Players can also take control of vehicles found in the world and perform stunts while driving them. From the third game onwards, players can also utilize Rico's parachute, grappling hook and wingsuit to travel around the map.

During the game, the player is given a main storyline as well as several side missions. Side missions may include liberating a village or taking over a drug cartel's villa. In Just Cause, these side missions are repetitive but necessary to gain points with certain factions. In Just Cause 2, the side missions became unique and more complex.

When not playing story or side missions, the player can free-roam in the open world. However, committing certain aggressive acts will attract a "heat" level (similar to Grand Theft Auto's wanted level), which will then increase the strength and number of enemy NPCs spawned seeking to kill the player.

Games

Just Cause (2006)

The core gameplay consists of elements of a third-person shooter and a driving game, with a large open environment to move around in. On foot, the player's character is capable of walking, swimming and jumping, as well as utilizing weapons and basic hand-to-hand combat. Players can take control of a variety of vehicles, including cars, boats, airplanes, helicopters and motorcycles. Players can also perform stunts with their cars. Other key features of the game include parasailing (grappling onto a moving vehicle while utilizing a parachute) and skydiving. Just Cause is set on the island nation of San Esperito (inspired by the Caribbean).

Just Cause 2 (2010)

Just Cause 2 is an action-adventure game with a large open-world sandbox map. The game is set on the fictional country of Panau (which is off of Southeast Asia), an archipelago ruled by Pandak 'Baby' Panay.

Originally set to be released in 2008, it was pushed back multiple times until it was released in North America on March 23, 2010, and in Europe on March 26, 2010.

Just Cause 3 (2015)

Just Cause 3 was released worldwide on December 1, 2015. The game is set on the fictional Mediterranean island of Medici, where it is run by dictator Di Ravello. Along with a larger map than Just Cause 2, there is the added feature of a wingsuit to be used by the main character, Rico Rodriguez.

The main storyline is longer than that of Just Cause 2, but the game does not feature faction side-missions, replacing them with 'random encounters' and a greater variety of races and other challenges. The game also allows players to shoot their way through walls, and expands destruction features.

Just Cause 4 (2018)

Just Cause 4 is the latest PC and console game in the Just Cause series, released on December 4, 2018. The game is set in the fictional South American country of Solís. The new dynamic weather systems expand upon the function of the wingsuit introduced in Just Cause 3 and are the focus of the storyline.

In comparison to Just Cause 3, the map is much larger and more diverse, however, the removal of its liberation mechanic does reduce the need to visit large portions of the map.

Just Cause Mobile (2023) 
Just Cause Mobile was officially announced by Square Enix during The Game Awards for iOS and Android mobile devices. It is a free-to-play action shooter game set in the Just Cause universe featuring single-player and multiplayer four player co-op and PvP gameplay for up to thirty players. While the console and PC games are third-person affairs, the mobile take on the franchise will feature a top-down isometric perspective. The game is scheduled to globally release in 2023.

Reception 
The Just Cause series has received a mixed reception from critics, but audiences generally have given the series a positive reception. Critics and audiences alike praise the series for its innovative gameplay, open-world design, set-pieces and non-linear approach to mission structure, however it is generally criticised for its generic storyline and cliché characters.

Film adaptation
In 2010, it was reported that a movie adaptation of Just Cause, titled Just Cause: Scorpion Rising, was in production, written by comic book writer Bryan Edward Hill. Nothing came of these plans, and Hill's Just Cause: Scorpion Rising was never produced.

In 2015, Adrian Askarieh, producer of the Hitman films, stated that he hoped to oversee a shared universe of Square Enix films with Just Cause, Hitman, Tomb Raider, Deus Ex, and Thief, but admitted that he does not have the rights to Tomb Raider. He also stated, at that time, that the latest outlook for the Just Cause film was that it would be based on the third release of the video game series. In May 2017, the Game Central reporters at Metro UK suggested that the shared universe was unlikely, pointing out that no progress had been made on any Just Cause, Deus Ex nor Thief films.

In March 2017, it was announced that Jason Momoa would play Rico Rodriguez and Brad Peyton would direct the film. , Peyton admitted that no script existed yet, and that he and Momoa already had full schedules well into 2019. On May 21, 2019, it was announced that Derek Kolstad would write the film. On July 15, 2020, it was announced that Michael Dowse would direct the film, which is produced by Constantin Film and Askarieh's Prime Universe and distributed by Universal Pictures.

See also
 Operation "Just Cause"
 List of Square Enix video game franchises

References

External links

 
 "Just Cause Franchise" on Steam

 
Action-adventure games
Open-world video games
Video game franchises
Video game franchises introduced in 2006
Square Enix franchises